The British Haiku Society (BHS) was formed in 1990 and aims to promote haiku and to teach and publish Haiku in English.

Activities
The BHS holds an Annual Haiku Award. From the 1990s until 2004 the Society also offered a Sasakawa Prize.

In 1992 the BHS published The Haiku Hundred, an anthology of haiku in English to bring haiku to the attention of UK readers.

In 2009, the then president of the society, Annie Bachini, complained about the quality of haiku being submitted to a haiku string competition where the winning entries, which were flashed on a screen at London King's Cross railway station, were judged by Yoko Ono and Jackie Kay.

The London Haiku Group meets under the auspices of the BHS and covers London and the South East of England.

Publications

Journal
The journal of the BHS is Blithe Spirit, which was named in honour of Reginald Horace Blyth and is currently edited by Iliyana Stoyanova. Haiku appearing in Blithe Spirit regularly feature in those recognised as being among the top 100 best haiku by European haijan (haiku poets). Contributors to Blithe Spirit have included the late Raymond Roseliep, American haiku poet and publisher Jim Kacian, American haiku poets Cor van den Heuvel and Michael Dylan Welch, British haiku poet Roger Watson and Ulster poet Maeve O'Sullivan. The BHS also produce a newsletter The Brief edited by David Bingham.

British Haiku Society Blithe Spirit: Journal of the British Haiku Society

Books
Kirkup J, Cobb D, Mortimer P (Eds.) (1992) The Haiku Hundred Iron Press, Manchester 
Cobb D (Ed.) (1994) The Genius of Haiku: Readings from R H Blyth on Poetry, Life, and Zen British Haiku Society, 
Cobb D, Lucas M (Edis.) (1998) The Iron Book of British Haiku Iron Press, Manchester 
Lucas M (2007) Stepping Stones: A Way Into haiku British Haiku Society, 
Hugh G (Ed.) (2015) A Silver Tapestry: The Best of 25 Years of Critical Writing from the British Haiku Society British Haiku Society, 
Stoyanova I (Ed.) (2017) EKPHRASIS: The British Haiku Society Members' Anthology 2017 British Haiku Society, 
Shimield A (Ed.) (2018) wild: the british haiku society anthology 2018 British Haiku Society, 
Bingham D, Stoyanove I (Eds.) (2019) where silence becomes song: International Haiku Conference Anthology British Haiku Society, 
Blundell C, Stoyanova I, Bingham D (Eds.) (2019) HARMONY WITHIN DIVERSITY: A collection of papers delivered at the International Haiku Conference in St Albans, UK 31 May - 2 June 2019 British Haiku Society, 
Hall KB (Ed.) (2019) Root: The British Haiku Society Members' Anthology 2019 British Haiku Society,

Recognition 
The BHS is listed in the International Who's Who in Poetry. The role of the BHS in the development of haiku in the UK has been recognised by the International Academic Forum (IAFOR) who sponsor the annual IAFOR Vladimir Devidé Haiku Award.

See also 

 Haiku Society of America (HSA)
 Haiku
 Haiku in English
 Matsuo Basho
 Reginald Horace Blyth

References

External links
 

Poetry organizations
Haiku
Literary magazines published in the United Kingdom
1990 establishments in the United Kingdom
Organizations established in 1990